El Malcriado was a Chicano/a labor newspaper that ran between 1964 and 1976. It was established by the Chicano labor leader Cesar Chavez as the unofficial newspaper of the United Farm Workers (originally National Farm Workers of America) during the Chicano/a Movement of the 1960s and early 1970s. Published in both English and Spanish editions, El Malcriado provided a forum for migrant workers to criticize working conditions and served as a way to organize the collective voice of Mexican American farmworkers. The newspaper's contents ranged from articles on union activities, coverage of labor issues, political commentary, cartoons, satire, and artwork. It is an example of ethnic press or alternative media that developed from political movements and immigrant communities within the United States to challenge existing power structures and gain political leverage.

Circulation 
El Malcriado was a primarily biweekly newspaper. Initially, copies were available for ten cents only at local grocery stores in Mexican American neighborhoods in the California Central Valley. Over time, the newspaper earned a list of paying monthly subscribers and expanded its audience to cities ranging from the Bay Area to Los Angeles In September 1965, El Malcriado published 3,000 copies in Spanish and 1,000 copies in English. The popularity of the grape strike and the publication of both Spanish and English editions caused the paper's audience to increase dramatically. After 1965, El Malcriado began to publish more copies in English than in Spanish (as much as 8,000 English copies and 3,000 Spanish copies) and continued to target an audience of English speaking Mexican American farm workers raised in the United States. The newspaper's readership peaked at 18,000 subscribers.

Publication history

Origin 
As early as 1962, Cesar Chavez and the NFWA discussed creating a newspaper. Chavez believed a newspaper was essential to politically organize uneducated farmworkers and provide a unifying voice for the movement. However, Chavez wanted to keep the paper separate from the NFWA to protect the union from being sued by growers. As a result, El Malcriado was published as a separate entity under the Farm Worker Press.

In English, El Malcriado roughly translates to "the ill-bred one," "the brat," "the bad boy," or "troublemaker." Chavez borrowed the name from a newspaper that ran during the Mexican Revolution. The title of Chavez's newspaper was therefore meant to reflect the rebellious spirit of the farmworker movement.

1964–1965: Early period 
In 1964, Chavez hired Andy Zermeño as the first staff member of El Malcriado, putting him in charge of graphics and illustrations, and later hired Bill Esher as the first editor. Although the newspaper officially became a separate entity from the NFWA after Esher arrived as editor, El Malcriado still remained politically in line with the union's goals. While Esher served as editor, Chavez remained heavily involved in translating and writing articles. Beginning with the fourth issue, the phrase “The Voice of the Farm Worker” was added to the newspaper nameplate. The first eighteen issues were written in Spanish; beginning after issue eighteen, El Malcriado was published in both Spanish and English editions. Chavez eventually hired Doug Adair, a young political activist, in 1965 to be in charge of the paper's English edition.

During first six months of the newspaper's existence, El Malcriado mostly focused on encouraging its readers to become NFWA members. However, as a result of the grape strikes led by the Agricultural Workers Organizing Committee (AWOC), in the summer of 1965 El Malcriado grew more radical and actively promoted striking. In one article, the newspaper provided instructions for new strikers. In another article, the writers promoted striking as the best method for laborers to obtain power.

El Malcriado helped spread news and boost morale for protesting farm workers during the Delano Grape Strike. The paper printed copies of Jack London’s essay, “Definition of a Strikebreaker” in response to scabs. The popularity of the grape strike led to a spike in the newspaper's readership.

In 1965, The FBI targeted El Malcriado after Chavez and the NFWA were accused of communist infiltration. The FBI used an article from El Malcriado as evidence to J. Edgar Hoover that the NFWA and Cesar Chavez were influenced by communism. They subsequently offered $1,000 for anyone that could provide information on communist infiltration of the NFWA or El Malcriado.

1966–1967: Rift between Chavez and newspaper staff) 
Between 1966 and 1967, the paper's main audience expanded from farmworkers to a broader coalition of sympathizers in cities from the Bay Area to Los Angeles.

As the paper grew, Chavez found that El Malcriado began to show an independent streak and often clashed with the paper's staff on certain issues. One point of conflict was over the 1966 California Governor Race, during which El Malcriado refused to endorse incumbent governor Pat Brown. Chavez, the NFWA, and the AFL-CIO agreed to support Pat Brown over his opponent Ronald Reagan. The staff of El Malcriado meanwhile had grievances with Brown for his bringing contracted Mexicans into California and accused him for being a traitor to Mexican Americans and farmworkers.

Another point of contention was over U.S. intervention in Vietnam. Despite the change in national attitude towards the war, the AFL-CIO, the UFWOC, and many farm workers were largely pro-war and supported President Lyndon B. Johnson. Chavez was strategically silent on the issue, and to avoid divisiveness, he urged Doug Adair and El Malcriado to remain neutral on the Vietnam War. Going against Chavez's orders, Doug Adair and the staff of El Malcriado openly expressed their opposition to U.S. involvement in Vietnam and criticized the draft. In one issue, El Malcriado published a photo of Mexican American GIs and a letter by a Mexican American GI urging fellow Mexican Americans to oppose the war.

Chavez became increasingly frustrated with the newspaper's staff and their disobedience. Both Bill Esher and Doug Adair noted Chavez's growing irritability and eventually left the paper. The last issue of El Malcriado in its first incarnation was published in August 1967; the paper went bankrupt after that.

1968–1976: Revivals and death of El Malcriado  
In 1968, El Malcriado was purchased by the United Farm Workers Organizing Committee, the new union, which combined the NFWA and AWOC, and consequently controlled much of the newspaper's content. Doug Adair returned as the paper's editor. As Chavez’s national profile grew, the tone of the paper grew increasingly subdued. Union lawyers “would read it word for word and make sure that there was nothing inappropriate or nothing out of line,” Adair recalled later.

After numerous revivals and cessations, Chavez began to gradually phase the newspaper out after 1971, as he believed it no longer served the movement's interests.

Content and themes

Journalism 
Many articles in El Maclriado reported the corrupt practices of employers and labor contractors. For example, the newspaper helped expose a corrupt labor contractor named Jimmy Hronis, who was notorious for stealing wages from underpaid sugar beet workers. El Malcriado reported that Hronis was only paying workers fifty cents per hour, which consequently lead to state hearings in which a judge forced Hronis to pay back his employees.

Zermeño cartoons 
El Malcriado used cartoons and graphics to visually communicate ideas to its audience, since not all farmworkers were literate. To do this, Chavez hired a Mexican American graphic artist named Andy Zermeño as the newspaper’s cartoonist. Zermeño and Chavez were responsible for the newspaper's iconic cartoon characters: Don Sotaco, Don Coyote, and El Patron or Patroncito. The magazine frequently depicted Don Sotaco, a misfortunate Mexican American farm worker, who was repeatedly exploited by his antagonistic boss, Patroncito. Don Sotaco represented the common Mexican-American farmworker without class consciousness. The character of Don Coyote represented the obsequious labor contractor and henchman of the grower. El Patron or Patroncito represented the grower and the owner of the fields and the boss of the farmworkers. In contrast to the union’s strategy of portraying its workers as embodiments of physical self-restraint, abstinent and sexually normative, the cartoons also frequently depicted growers as “sexually corrupt and undisciplined,” or in drag or homosexual relationships. The Don Sotaco cartoons informed the newspaper's audience on issues affecting Mexican-American laborers and helped raise a sense of class consciousness. Chavez and Zermeño hoped the newspaper's readership would identify with the character of Don Sotaco, and this would help educate farmworkers about their rights. The comics employed humor, satire, and irony to expose the exploitation of migrant farmworkers.

Connections to other political movements 
El Malcriado often displayed solidarity with other social justice causes and connected the farm workers’ movement to the larger Civil Rights Movement. In one article, the newspaper compared a rent strike occurring in Tulare County to the efforts made by Civil Rights activists in Alabama and Mississippi. In another article they compared the Delano grape strike to the Montgomery Bus Boycott.  After the assassination of Martin Luther King Jr., El Malcriado dedicated the entire April 15, 1968 edition to his legacy, highlighting his efforts in fighting for workers rights. The issue’s title asserted that King was killed for organizing workers and connected his legacy to the efforts of Mexican farm workers.

El Malcriado also connected the struggles of migrant Mexican workers to the legacy of Mexican Revolution. For example, Chavez borrowed the newspaper’s title from another newspaper that ran during the Mexican Revolution. Covers of El Malcriado often featured engravings of Mexican peasant life and rural Mexico. At other times the magazine used images of Mexican Revolution era figures such as Emiliano Zapata and Pancho Villa.

El Malcriado opposed the war in Vietnam. The newspaper demonstrated sympathy with the anti-war movement when it published an image of Mexican American GIs along with a letter from a Mexican American GI urging fellow Mexican Americans to oppose U.S. involvement in Vietnam.

Legacy 
El Malcriado represents one of the first examples of Chicano/a press and influenced later Chicano/a newspapers for combining art, satire, and political commentary.

An online archive of El Malcriado is available via the Farmworker Documentation Project at University of California, San Diego.

References 

Defunct newspapers published in California
Cesar Chavez
Bilingual newspapers